The Church of Saint-Cyr-Sainte-Julitte is a Roman Catholic church located in Villejuif, Val-de-Marne, France. It is listed as a Historic Monument.

Location
The church is located on the town hall square. It is adjacent to the town hall.

History
The church was dedicated to Saint Cyricus and his mother Saint Julitta, two martyrs of the 4th century.
The church was founded in the 13th century and was completely renovated with dimension stone and rubbles in 1535. The bell tower has the inscription "Memento mori 1549". In 1870, the church was occupied by the Communards.

The church was listed as a Historic Monument in 1928. The organ, made by manufacturers Hippolyte Loret and Gabriel Cavaillé-Coll, is a listed monument since 1991. The stained glass windows were made by Louis-Charles-Marie Champigneulle. The bell tower was restored from 1981 to 1988.

On April 19th, 2015, a student, Sid Ahmed Ghlam, was arrested following a murder and was found to have been planning a shooting in the churches of Saint-Cyr-et-Sainte-Julitte and of St. Theresa during a Sunday Mass. According to the priest of Saint-Cyr-Sainte-Julitte, the arrest prevented a massacre, since 300 hundred people were present in the church on that day. Villejuif had already been targeted by Islamist terrorist Amedy Coulibaly during the January 2015 attacks.

References

Bibliography 

 

Churches in Val-de-Marne
13th-century Roman Catholic church buildings in France
13th-century establishments in France
Monuments historiques of Île-de-France
Villejuif